Katsuhiro (written: 勝洋, 勝浩, 勝弘, 勝大, 克広, 克央, 克洋 or 功宗) is a masculine Japanese given name. Notable people with the name include:

, Japanese politician
, Japanese sumo wrestler
, Japanese game producer
, Japanese sumo wrestler
, Japanese footballer
, Japanese swimmer
, Japanese footballer
, Japanese Magic: The Gathering player
, Japanese baseball player
Katsuhiro Nakagawa, Japanese businessman
, Japanese baseball player, coach and manager
, Japanese footballer
, Japanese manga artist, screenwriter and film director
, Japanese beach volleyball player
, Japanese footballer
, Japanese racing driver

Japanese masculine given names